War of the Worlds (2016) was a professional wrestling tour co-produced by the American Ring of Honor (ROH) and Japanese New Japan Pro-Wrestling (NJPW) promotions. The tour's three events took place on May 9 at the Ford Community & Performing Arts Center in Dearborn, Michigan, May 11 at the Ted Reeve Arena in Toronto, Ontario and May 14 at Terminal 5 in New York City, New York. The second night in Toronto was taped for four episodes of Ring of Honor Wrestling. 2016 was the third year in which ROH and NJPW co-produce events under the War of the Worlds name.

Production

Background
In February 2014, the American Ring of Honor (ROH) promotion announced a partnership with the Japanese New Japan Pro-Wrestling (NJPW) promotion, which led to the two co-producing the Global Wars and War of the Worlds events in Toronto and New York City, respectively, the following May. A year later, the partnership continued with War of the Worlds '15 and Global Wars '15, which were both two-day events, taking place in Philadelphia and Toronto, respectively. On August 21, 2015, representatives of NJPW and ROH declared that the relationship between the two promotions was stronger than ever, announcing another North American tour for May 2016, featuring new locations and wrestlers, as well as the first co-produced shows between the two promotions in Tokyo. The two-day event, entitled Honor Rising: Japan 2016, took place on February 19 and 20, 2016.

On February 4, 2016, ROH officially announced the War of the Worlds tour, taking place on May 9 in Dearborn, Michigan, May 11 in Toronto and May 14 in New York City. On April 16, ROH announced the NJPW wrestlers taking part in the tour; IWGP Heavyweight Champion Tetsuya Naito, ROH World Television Champion Tomohiro Ishii, IWGP Junior Heavyweight Champion Kushida, Gedo, Hiroshi Tanahashi, Jyushin Thunder Liger and Kazuchika Okada. On April 18, ROH added NJPW's IWGP Tag Team Champions Guerrillas of Destiny (Tama Tonga and Tanga Loa) to the tour. ROH later added IWGP Intercontinental Champion Kenny Omega to the Toronto event of the tour. It had previously been reported that Omega had had issues with his visa, which could prevent him from taking part in the rest of the tour. On May 6, NJPW officially added Yoshitatsu to the Toronto event. Jyushin Thunder Liger was pulled from the Dearborn event after being dropped on his head during the May 8 Global Wars event. Nick Jackson suffered a rib injury during his first match at the Toronto event and was pulled from his second match as well as the New York City event. Meanwhile, Tetsuya Naito was hospitalized during the tour with high fever, but did not miss any shows. Others suffering minor injuries during the tour included Hiroshi Tanahashi and Matt Jackson.

Storylines

The War of the Worlds tour featured professional wrestling matches that involved different wrestlers from pre-existing scripted feuds and storylines. Wrestlers portrayed villains, heroes, or less distinguishable characters in the scripted events that built tension and culminated in a wrestling match or series of matches.

The May 9 Dearborn event was advertised as being headlined by a tag team match between The Briscoes (Jay Briscoe and Mark Briscoe) and The Motor City Machine Guns (Alex Shelley and Chris Sabin). Shelley and Sabin reunited at ROH's 14th Anniversary Show in February and have since wrestled regularly in ROH's tag team division. The Briscoes, meanwhile, had recently become the number one contenders to the ROH World Tag Team Championship. Even though ROH billed this as the "very first time" the two teams would face each other in a two-on-two match, the two teams had actually met in April 2007, when Shelley and Sabin unsuccessfully challenged The Briscoes for the ROH World Tag Team Championship. Both teams have a championship history in NJPW with Shelley and Sabin winning the IWGP Junior Heavyweight Championship in 2009, and The Briscoes becoming two-time NEVER Openweight 6-Man Tag Team Champions earlier in the year. Following the events of Global Wars, the main event was changed with The Briscoes and The Motor City Machine Guns coming together with Adam Page to take on the Bullet Club stable in a ten-man tag team match. Another top match in Dearborn would see IWGP Heavyweight Champion Tetsuya Naito team up with ROH World Champion Jay Lethal to take on reDRagon (Bobby Fish and Kyle O'Reilly). The partnership between Naito and Lethal was formed during February's Honor Rising: Japan 2016 event, where Naito's Los Ingobernables de Japón (L.I.J.) stable helped Lethal retain the ROH World Championship against Tomoaki Honma. Afterwards, Lethal and his then manager Truth Martini joined L.I.J. reDRagon also has a history in NJPW, where they are former two-time IWGP Junior Heavyweight Tag Team Champions.

The May 11 Toronto event was advertised as being main evented by Jay Lethal taking on Donovan Dijak. The storyline behind the two dated back to early 2015, when Dijak won the Top Prospect Tournament. In the aftermath, Dijak agreed to forgo his earned shot at Jay Lethal's ROH World Television Championship by joining him in Truth Martini's House of Truth stable. Finally, at the end of the year, after Dijak had been approached by Prince Nana, Martini fired Dijak, who quickly picked up Nana as his new manager and announced he would dissolve the House of Truth one member at a time. After in storyline hospitalizing Martini and defeating former tag team partner Joey Daddiego, Dijak attacked Lethal on April 30, dropped him with his finishing maneuver, Feast Your Eyes, and posed with the ROH World Championship belt. The match was not advertised as being for the title. The show also included reigning IWGP Junior Heavyweight Champion Kushida taking on Kyle O'Reilly in a non-title match. This was a rematch from the finals of NJPW's 2015 Best of the Super Juniors tournament, where Kushida defeated O'Reilly.

The May 14 New York City event was advertised as being main evented by a six-man tag team match, where a New Japan Pro-Wrestling "All Stars" team, made up of Hiroshi Tanahashi, Kazuchika Okada and Tomohiro Ishii, would take on a Ring of Honor "All Stars" team, made up of Jay Briscoe, Jay Lethal and Roderick Strong. However, on May 13, ROH rearranged the entire card with a new three-way tag team main event, where Bullet Club's Adam Cole and Matt Jackson take on Kazuchika Okada and Tomohiro Ishii, representing NJPW, and Jay Lethal and Roderick Strong, representing ROH. Also on the card, War Machine (Hanson and Ray Rowe) were set to defend the ROH World Tag Team Championship in a three-way match against The Addiction (Christopher Daniels and Frankie Kazarian) and reDRagon. However, on May 9, The Addiction defeated War Machine in an unadvertised match at the Dearborn show to capture the title. On May 13, ROH announced a title rematch between The Addiction and War Machine for the event.

Results
May 9

May 11 (TV taping)

May 14

Notes
The name has been written as both "Tanga Loa" and "Tanga Roa".

See also

Professional wrestling in Canada

References

External links
War of the Worlds 2016 Night 1 at ROHWrestling.com
War of the Worlds 2016 Night 2 at ROHWrestling.com
War of the Worlds 2016 Night 3 at ROHWrestling.com
Official New Japan Pro-Wrestling website 

2016 in professional wrestling
2016
Professional wrestling in Toronto
May 2016 events in the United States
Professional wrestling in New York City
Professional wrestling in Dearborn, Michigan
Events in Wayne County, Michigan